Numena (1987) is an album by the American ambient musician Robert Rich.  This is the most active solo album Rich had released by this time.  It features the use of a variety of acoustic percussion instruments and just intonation for the first time in Rich’s career.

The longest and most complicated track on the album is a piece called “The Other Side of Twilight”.  It consists of two movements, each with a different gamelan-inspired electronic sequence and natural ambience.

This is also the first Robert Rich album to be originally released on compact disc.  In 1997, Numena was bound in a two disc set with the album Geometry.

Note
Prior to the release of this album, a shorter alternate version of “The Other Side of Twilight” was broadcast on the National Public Radio program Music from the Hearts of Space.

Track listing
”The Other Side of Twilight” – 25:04
”Moss Dance” – 5:40
”Numen” – 11:51
”The Walled Garden” – 10:31

1987 albums
Robert Rich (musician) albums